Luciana Braga Ribeiro Ramos (born 16 December 1962) is a Brazilian actress.

Career 
She made his television debut in 1986, in the soap opera Sinhá Moça.

She also appeared in the Rede Manchete in the soap operas Helena, 1987, in which she was the protagonist, and Olho por Olho, 1988.

In 1989 participated in the novel Tieta, interpreting Maria Imaculada, one of the rolinhas of the Colonel (Ary Fontoura). Later it participated of other novelas like Meu Bem, Meu Mal and Renascer, both from TV Globo.

In 1994, she signed with SBT, and was featured in two soap operas there, Éramos Seis and As Pupilas do Senhor Reitor.

In 2008 she played the villain Denise in the soap opera Negócio da China.

In May 2009 he signed a contract with RecordTV. At the station she made soap operas like Poder Paralelo, Vidas em Jogo, Vitória and A Terra Prometida.

In 2018 the actress enters to the fixed list of Detetives do Prédio Azul, living the main villain of the tenth season.

Personal life 
Luciana is married to the theatrical illuminator Maneco Quinderé since 1993, they have two daughters, Isabel and Laura.

Filmography

Television

Films

References

External links

1962 births
Living people
Actresses from Rio de Janeiro (city)
Brazilian television actresses
Brazilian telenovela actresses
Brazilian film actresses
Brazilian stage actresses